Cahuarano is an extinct indigenous American language of the Zaparoan family, once spoken along the Nanay River in Peru. The last speaker died in the late 1980s or early 1990s. While considered a language by most scholars, it was considered by some to be a dialect of Iquito.

Its speakers, who were of the Moracano tribe, lived north of the Nanay River northwest of Iquitos. In 1930,  estimated the language's number of speakers to be around 1,000, while linguist Gustavo Solís gave the number 5 in 1987.

References

Languages of Peru
Zaparoan languages
Languages extinct in the 1990s
Extinct languages of South America